Cosmotriche lobulina is a moth of the family Lasiocampidae. It is found in Europe through Siberia up to Eastern Asia.

The wingspan is 32–38 mm for males and 38–46 for females. The moth flies from May to August in two generations depending on the location.

The larvae feed on Pinus, Picea, and Abies species.

Subspecies
Cosmotriche lobulina lobulina
Cosmotriche lobulina burmanni (Daniel, 1952)
Cosmotriche lobulina junia Saarenmaa, 1982
Cosmotriche lobulina pinivora (Matsumura, 1927)

External links

Fauna Europaea
www.lepiforum.de

Lasiocampidae
Moths described in 1775
Moths of Japan
Moths of Europe
Taxa named by Michael Denis
Taxa named by Ignaz Schiffermüller